Oscar A. Hall (December 15, 1923 — June 4, 2004) was an American politician and lawyer from Rawlins, Wyoming who served a single term in the Wyoming House of Representatives, representing Carbon County from 1959 to 1961 as a Democrat in the 35th Wyoming Legislature.

Early life and education
Hall was born in Rawlins, Wyoming on December 15, 1923. His parents, Anna Sjogren and Alget Peter Hall, were immigrants from Sweden.

Hall graduated from high school as valedictorian in 1941. Hall moved to Laramie, Wyoming and graduated from the University of Wyoming College of Law with a Juris Doctor in June of 1952.

Career
Hall began a law practice in January of 1955.

Hall served as City Attorney of Rawlins under Mayor Sam Tully. He served out the remainder of County Attorney Dudley Miles's term, and was himself elected to three four-year terms as Carbon County Attorney.

In 1959, Hall was elected to a single term in the Wyoming House of Representatives. He represented Carbon County from 1959 to 1961 as a Democrat in the 35th Wyoming Legislature. Hall represented Carbon County alongside Democrats Joe Cecchin and Jay House.

Hall retired from practicing law in 1988.

Personal life and death
Hall was a member of the Wyoming Bar Association and The Elks. He was also president of the Carbon County Historical Society.

On July 12, 1948, Hall eloped with Margaret Ileene Hennek, whom he married in the First Methodist Church of Reno in Reno, Nevada. The Halls had six children together.

On October 4, 2004, Hall died of a stroke at the age of 80.

Notes

References

External links
Official page at the Wyoming Legislature

1923 births
2004 deaths
20th-century American politicians
Democratic Party members of the Wyoming House of Representatives
University of Wyoming College of Law alumni
People from Rawlins, Wyoming